
Gmina Lipowiec Kościelny is a rural gmina (administrative district) in Mława County, Masovian Voivodeship, in east-central Poland.  Its seat is the village of Lipowiec Kościelny, which lies approximately 14 kilometres (8 mi) west of Mława and 112 km (69 mi) north-west of Warsaw.

Villages
Gmina Lipowiec Kościelny contains the villages and settlements of Borowe, Cegielnia Lewicka, Dobra Wola, Józefowo, Kęczewo, Krępa, Lewiczyn, Lipowiec Kościelny, Łomia, Niegocin, Parcele Łomskie, Rumoka, Turza Mała, Turza Wielka, Wola Kęczewska and Zawady.

Neighbouring gminas
Gmina Lipowiec Kościelny is bordered by the town of Mława and by the gminas of Działdowo, Iłowo-Osada, Kuczbork-Osada, Szreńsk and Wiśniewo.

References

Polish official population figures 2006

Lipowiec Koscielny
Mława County